Skavica Hydro Power Plant is a proposed large power plant on the Drin River situated in Albania.

The project consists of a large power plant with a nominal capacity of 250 MW on the Drin River operated by the Italian company TGK Group that will invest US$664 million in the project.

External links

 UPDATE THE SKAVICA PROJECT IS BEING DEVELOPED BY AN AMERICAN COMPANY: ALASKAN-AEGEAN ENERGY RESOURCES UTILIZATION, LLC BASED OUT OF BETHEL ALASKA.

Hydroelectric power stations in Albania
Proposed hydroelectric power stations
Proposed renewable energy power stations in Albania